Sons of the Sea is the self-titled debut album by American alternative rock band Sons of the Sea, a collaboration between Incubus frontman Brandon Boyd and producer Brendan O'Brien. It was released on September 24, 2013 through Avow Records (distribution through INgrooves) in North America. The album was released in Europe through Membran Entertainment on March 3, 2014 and contains 3 acoustic bonus tracks: Space and Time, Come Together and Lady Black. A video for 'Come Together' featuring Boyd and Adesuwa Pariyapasat was directed by Taylor Cohen and first aired on the day of the North American release.

Track listing

Personnel
Sons of the Sea
 Brandon Boyd – performer, engineering, drums
 Brendan O'Brien – performer, engineering, producer

Additional personnel
 Josh Freese – drums
 Jamie Muhoberac – piano 
 Jackie O'Brien – additional background vocals 
 Tom Syrowski – engineering
 Peter Mack – assistant engineer
 Kyle Stevens – assistant engineer
 Martin Cooke – additional engineering
 Billy Joe Bowers – mastering

References

2013 albums
Albums produced by Brendan O'Brien (record producer)